Gustaf Adolf may refer to:

Royalty 
 Gustaf VI Adolf (1882–1973), King of Sweden 1950–1973
 Prince Gustaf Adolf, Duke of Västerbotten (1906–1947), prince of Sweden

Soldier 
 Gustaf Adolf Lewenhaupt (1619–1656), Swedish soldier and statesman.
 Gustaf Adolf Westring (1900–1963), Swedish Air Force lieutenant general

See also 
 Gustav Adolf (disambiguation)